List of Guggenheim Fellowships awarded in 1980.

1980 U.S. and Canadian Fellows 

 John N. Abelson, Chairman, Professor of Chemistry, California Institute of Technology: 1980.
 Charles Altieri, Professor of English, University of California, Berkeley: 1980.
 William P. Arend, Head, Division of Rheumatology, Professor of Medicine, University of Colorado Health Sciences Center at Denver: 1980.
 Donald R. Arnold, Alexander McLeod Professor of Chemistry, Dalhousie University: 1980.
 Donald E. Aylor, Head, Department of Plant Pathology & Ecology, Connecticut Agricultural Experiment Station, New Haven: 1980.
 Yee Jan Bao, Artist; Visiting Artist, Rhode Island School of Design: 1980.
 Benjamin Barber, Walt Whitman Professor of Political Science, Rutgers University: 1980.
 Marc Bekoff, Professor of Biology, University of Colorado, Boulder: 1980.
 Herman Belz, Professor of History, University of Maryland at College Park: 1980.
 Thomas Bender, University Professor of the Humanities, New York University: 1980.
 Jerome A. Berson, Sterling Professor Emeritus of Chemistry, Yale University: 1980.
 Jagdish N. Bhagwati, Arthur Lehman Professor of Economics, Columbia University: 1980.
 Daniel P. Biebuyck, H. Rodney Sharp Professor Emeritus of Anthropology and Humanities, University of Delaware: 1980.
 Joseph L. Birman, Distinguished Professor of Physics, City College and Graduate Center, City University of New York: 1980.
 Patricia Blake, Writer, New York City: 1980.
 R. Howard Bloch, Augustus R. Street Professor of French, Yale University: 1980.
 Thomas Blumenthal, Chair, Professor of Biology, University of Colorado School of Medicine, Denver: 1980.
 Paul J. Bohannan, Professor Emeritus of Anthropology and Dean of Social Sciences and Communications, University of Southern California: 1980.
 Frederick G. Bordwell, Professor Emeritus of Chemistry, Northwestern University: 1980.
 Samuel Bowles, Professor of Economics, University of Massachusetts Amherst: 1980.
 Paul D. Brekke, Film Maker, Ventura, California: 1980.
 Olga Broumas, Poet, Provincetown, Massachusetts: 1980.
 Jonathan Brown, Carroll and Milton Petrie Professor of Fine Arts, Institute of Fine Arts, New York University: 1980.
 Beverly Buchanan, Artist, Athens, Georgia: 1980.
 Charles Burnett, Film Maker, Los Angeles: 1980.
 Elias Burstein, Mary Amanda Wood Professor Emeritus of Physics, University of Pennsylvania: 1980.
 Deborah Butterfield, Artist; Assistant Professor of Art, Montana State University: 1980.
 Guillermo A. Calvo, Senior Advisor, The International Monetary Fund, Washington DC: 1980.
 Vincent P. Carosso, Deceased.U.S. History: 1980.
 Marvin H. Caruthers, Professor of Chemistry, University of Colorado, Boulder: 1980.
 Robbie Case, Deceased. Education: 1980.
 Vija Celmins, Artist, New York City: 1980.
 James J. Champoux, Professor of Microbiology, University of Washington: 1980.
 Jane Chance, Professor of English, Rice University: 1980. Appointed as Jane Chance Nitzsche.
 Alison Becker Chase, Choreographer, Stony Creek, Connecticut: 1980.
 Roger Chickering, Professor of History, University of Oregon: 1980.
 Phyllis Chinlund, Film Maker, New York City: 1980.
 John S. Chipman, Regent's Professor of Economics, University of Minnesota: 1980.
 David V. Chudnovsky, Research Associate in Mathematics, Columbia University: 1980.
 Gregory V. Chudnovsky, Research Associate in Mathematics, Columbia University: 1980.
 Selma Jeanne Cohen, Writer, New York City: 1980.
 Dimitri Conomos, Professor of Music, University of British Columbia: 1980.
 William James Cooper Jr., Boyd Professor of History, Louisiana State University: 1980.
 Robert Cumming, Photographer, Whately, Massachusetts: 1980.
 Frank A. D'Accone, Professor Emeritus of Musicology, University of California, Los Angeles: 1980.
 Robert V. Daniels, Professor Emeritus of History, University of Vermont: 1980.
 Joseph W. Dauben, Professor of History and History of Science, Herbert H Lehman College and Graduate Center, City University of New York: 1980.
 Warren Dean, Deceased. Spanish and Latin American History: 1980.
 Nicholas Delbanco, Robert Frost Collegiate Professor of English Language & Literature and Director, Program in Creative Writing, University of Michigan: 1980.
 David Dolphin, Professor of Chemistry, University of British Columbia: 1980.
 Michael W. Dols, Deceased. Near Eastern Studies: 1980.
 Wendy Doniger, Mircea Eliade Distinguished Professor of the History of Religion, University of Chicago: 1980. Married name: O'Flaherty, Wendy Doniger.
 James S. Donnelly, Jr., Professor of History, University of Wisconsin–Madison: 1980.
 James Doolin, Artist, Los Angeles, California: 1980.
 Ronald G. Douglas, Executive Vice President and Provost, Texas A&M University: 1980.
 Robert Drews, Professor of Classics & History, Vanderbilt University: 1980.
 Douglas Dunn, Choreographer, New York City: 1980.
 George Edwards, Composer; MacDowell Professor of Music, Columbia University: 1980, 1985.
 Stanley L. Engerman, John H. Munro Professor of Economics and Professor of History, University of Rochester: 1980.
 Susan June Felter, Photographer, Emeryville, California: 1980.
 Brian Fennelly, Composer; Emeritus Professor of Music, New York University: 1980.
 Diana Festa-McCormick, Professor of Modern Languages and Literatures, Brooklyn College, City University of New York: 1980.
 John Francis Fetzer, Emeritus Professor of German, University of California, Davis: 1980.
 Vivian Fine, Deceased. Music Composition: 1980.
 John Miles Foley, William H. Byler Distinguished Chair in the Humanities and Professor of English, University of Missouri-Columbia: 1980.
 Andrew Forge, Professor Emeritus of Art, Yale University: 1980.
 Allen Forte, Battell Professor of the Theory of Music, Yale University: 1980.
 Edward Norval Fortson, Professor of Physics, University of Washington: 1980.
 Ralph W. Franklin, Director, Beinecke Rare Book and Manuscript Library, Yale University: 1980.
 Kathleen Fraser, Poet; Professor of Creative Writing, San Francisco State University: 1980.
 Ralph Freedman, Professor Emeritus of Comparative Literature, Princeton University; Adjunct Professor of Comparative Literature, Emory University: 1980.
 Michael Freeling, Professor of Genetics, University of California, Berkeley: 1980.
 Gregory L. Freeze, Professor of History, Brandeis University: 1980.
 Hans Wilhelm Frei, Deceased. Religion: 1980.
 Mordechai A. Friedman, The Joseph and Ceil Mazer Chair in Jewish Culture in Muslim Lands and Cairo Geniza Studies, Tel-Aviv University: 1980.
 David C. Frost, Professor Emeritus of Chemistry, University of British Columbia: 1980.
 William Fulton, Professor of Mathematics, Brown University: 1980.
 David Gebhard, Deceased. Architecture & Design: 1980.
 William H. Gerdts, Professor of Art, Brooklyn College and Graduate Center, City University of New York: 1980.
 James Gindin, Deceased. 20th Century English Literature: 1980.
 Richard A. Goldthwaite, Professor of History, Johns Hopkins University: 1980.
 Robert J. Gordon, Stanley G. Harris Professor of Social Sciences, Northwestern University: 1980.
 Robert Griffith, Professor of History, American University, Washington, DC: 1980.
 Phillip A. Griffiths, Director, Institute For Advanced Study, Princeton, New Jersey: 1980.
 Gerald N. Grob, Henry E. Sigerist Professor of History, Rutgers University: 1980.
 Bill Gunn, Deceased. Film: 1980.
 Marilyn Hacker, Poet, New York City: 1980.
 Louis N. Hand, Professor of Physics, Cornell University: 1980.
 Jon Hassler, Writer; Writer-in-Residence, St. John's University, Collegeville, Minnesota: 1980.
 Dennis E. Hayes, Chair, Professor of Geological Sciences and Deputy Director for Education, Lamont-Doherty Geological Observatory, Columbia University: 1980.
 C. Vance Haynes, Professor of Anthropology and Geosciences, University of Arizona: 1980.
 Jene Highstein, Artist, New York City: 1980.
 Daryl Hine, Poet and Translator, Evanston, Illinois: 1980.
 Douglas Hofstadter, College Professor of Cognitive Science, Indiana University: 1980.
 Tom Holland, Artist, Berkeley, California; Instructor in Painting, College of the San Francisco Art Institute: 1980.
 Gerald Holton, Mallinckrodt Professor Emeritus of Physics and Emeritus Professor of the History of Science, Harvard University: 1980.
 Jasper Hopkins, Jr., Professor of Philosophy, University of Minnesota: 1980.
 Donald L. Horowitz, James B. Duke Professor of Law and Political Science, Duke University: 1980.
 Morton J. Horwitz, Charles Warren Professor of the History of American Law, Harvard Law School: 1980.
 Karl Y. Hostetler, Professor of Medicine, School of Medicine, University of California, San Diego: 1980.
 David L. Hull, Dressler Professor of Philosophy, Northwestern University: 1980.
 Joseph D. Jachna, Photographer; Professor of Art and Design, University of Illinois at Chicago: 1980.
 Robert W. Jackman, Professor of Political Science, University of California, Davis, CA: 1980.
 Russell Jacoby, Historian, Venice, California: 1980.
 Margaret Jenkins, Choreographer; Artistic Director, Margaret Jenkins Dance Company, San Francisco: 1980.
 Len Jenshel, Photographer, New York City: 1980.
 Michael Kammen, Newton C. Farr Professor of American History and Culture, Cornell University: 1980.
 Jay Katz, Harvey L. Karp Professorial Lecturer in Law and Psychoanalysis, Yale Law School: 1980.
 Martin T. Katzman, Deceased. Planning: 1980.
 Herbert C. Kelman, Richard Clarke Cabot Research Professor of Social Ethics, Harvard University: 1980.
 John L. Kessell, Historian; Professor Emeritus of History, University of New Mexico, Albuquerque: 1980.
 James King, Distinguished University Professor, McMaster University: 1980.
 Gordon L. Kipling, Professor of English, University of California, Los Angeles: 1980.
 Yoshito Kishi, Morris Loeb Research Professor of Chemistry, Harvard University: 1980.
 Victor Klee Jr., Emeritus Professor of Mathematics and Adjunct Professor of Computer Science, University of Washington: 1980.
 Herbert S. Klein, Professor of History, Columbia University: 1980.
 Walter G. Klemperer, Professor of Chemistry, University of Illinois: 1980.
 Arthur V. Kreiger, Composer; Adjunct Associate Professor of Music, Baruch College, New York City: 1980.
 Ravi S. Kulkarni, Professor of Mathematics, Graduate Center, City University of New York: 1980.
 Henry E. Kyburg, Jr., Burbank Professor of Philosophy and Professor of Computer Science, University of Rochester: 1980.
 David L. Lambert, Isabel McCutcheon Harte Centennial Chair of Astronomy, University of Texas at Austin: 1980.
 Ellen Langer, Professor of Psychology, Harvard University: 1980.
 Gerda Lerner, Robinson-Edwards Professor Emeritus of History and WARF Senior Distinguished Research Professor Emeritus, University of Wisconsin–Madison: 1980.
 Pamela Levy, Artist, Jerusalem: 1980.
 William M. Lewis, Jr., Director, Center for Limnology and Chair, Department of Environmental, Population, and Organismic Biology, University of Colorado, Boulder: 1980.
 Anatoly Liberman, Professor of German and Scandinavian, University of Minnesota: 1980.
 Kristin Linklater, Director of Training, Shakespeare & Company, Lenox, Massachusetts: 1980.
 Romulus Linney, Writer, New York City: 1980.
 Lawrence Lipking, Chester D. Tripp Professor of Humanities, Northwestern University: 1980.
 Philip Li-Fan Liu, Professor of Civil and Environmental Engineering, Cornell University: 1980.
 R. Duncan Luce, Distinguished Research Professor of Cognitive Science, University of California-Irvine: 1980.
 Ross J. MacIntyre, Professor of Genetics, Cornell University: 1980.
 John E. Malmstad, Samuel Hazzard Cross Professor of Slavic Languages and Literatures, Harvard University: 1980.
 Peter Marin, Writer, Santa Barbara California: 1980.
 Peter T. Marsh, Honorary Professor of History, Syracuse University: 1980.
 Peter K. Marshall, Moore Professor of Latin, Amherst College: 1980.
 Odaline de la Martinez, Composer; Fellow of the Royal Academy of Music, London: 1980.
 Michael Marton, Filmmaker, Burtonsvillle, Maryland: 1980.
 Eric Maskin, Professor of Economics, Harvard University: 1980.
 Herbert Matter, Deceased. Photography: 1980.
 Donald R. Matthews, Professor Emeritus of Political Science, University of Washington: 1980.
 William Matthews, Poet; Professor of English, City College, New York City: 1980.
 John R. Maynard, Professor of English, New York University: 1980.
 Marian McPartland, Writer, Composer, and Musician, Port Washington, New York: 1980.
 Ana Mendieta, Deceased. Fine Arts: 1980.
 Paul Meyvaert, Former Executive Director, Mediaeval Academy of America, Cambridge, Massachusetts: 1980.
 Murray A. Milne, Emeritus Professor of Architecture and Urban Design, University of California, Los Angeles: 1980.
 Robert Mitsuru Miura, Professor of Mathematics, University of British Columbia: 1980.
 Ann Grace Mojtabai, Writer, Silver Spring, Maryland: 1980.
 Joel Mokyr, Chair, Robert H. Strotz Professor of Arts and Sciences and Professor of Economics & History, Northwestern University: 1980.
 John Monfasani, Professor of History, State University of New York at Albany: 1980.
 Harold J. Morowitz, Director, Krasnow Institute for Advanced Study, and Clarence Robinson Professor of Biology and Natural Sciences, George Mason University, Fairfax, VA: 1980.
 Mary Morris, Writer, New York City; Fellow in Creative Writing, American Academy in Rome: 1980.
 Edward C. Moses, Artist, Venice, California: 1980.
 James T. Muckerman, Chemist, Brookhaven National Laboratory; Adjunct Associate Professor, Research Institute for Engineering Sciences, Wayne State University: 1980.
 Royce W. Murray, Kenan Professor of Chemistry, University of North Carolina at Chapel Hill: 1980.
 Sydney Nathans, Associate Professor of History, Duke University: 1980.
 Homer Neal, Professor of Physics and Chairman, Physics Department, University of Michigan: 1980.
 Douglas Francis Nemanic, Film Maker, Gunnison, Colorado: 1980.
 John Neubauer, Professor of Comparative Literature, University of Amsterdam: 1980.
 Howard Allan Norman, Writer and Translator; Professor of English, University of Maryland: 1980.
 Jerry Norman, Emeritus Professor of Chinese Languages and Linguistics, University of Washington: 1980.
 Martha Craven Nussbaum, Ernst Freund Distinguished Service Professor of Law and Ethics, University of Chicago: 1980.
 Mary Oliver, Poet, Provincetown, Massachusetts; Katherine Osgood Chair for Distinguished Teaching, Bennington College: 1980.
 James Olney, Editor, The Southern Review; Voorhies Professor of English, French and Italian, Louisiana State University, Baton Rouge: 1980.
 Stanley Olson, Deceased. Biography: 1980.
 Ian Ousby, Writer, Cambridge, England: 1980.
 Warwick J. B. Owen, Professor Emeritus of English, McMaster University: 1980.
 Stephen Pace, Artist, Professor Emeritus of Art, American University: 1980.
 Seymour A. Papert, Professor of Media Technology, Massachusetts Institute of Technology: 1980.
 Robert L. Patten, Lynette S. Autrey Professor in Humanities, Rice University: 1980.
 James L. Peacock III, Chair, Kenan Professor of Anthropology and Professor of Comparative Literature, University of North Carolina at Chapel Hill: 1980.
 Russell A. Peck Jr., John Hall Deane Professor of English, University of Rochester: 1980.
 Donn Alan Pennebaker, Film Maker; Artist-in-Residence, Leonard Davis Center for the Performing Arts, City College, City University of New York; Professor of Film Studies, Yale University: 1980.
 Gordon H. Pettengill, Professor Emeritus of Planetary Physics and Director for Space Research, Massachusetts Institute of Technology: 1980.
 Robert Pinsky, Professor of Creative Writing and English, Boston University; Poet Laureate, United States of America: 1980.
 Robert M. Polhemus, Professor of English, Stanford University: 1980.
 Florante A. Quiocho, Charles C. Bell Professor of Structural Biology, and Investigator, Howard Hughes Medical Institute, Rice University: 1980.
 Paul Rabinow, Professor of Anthropology, University of California, Berkeley: 1980.
 Kenneth N. Raymond, Vice Chairman, Professor of Chemistry, University of California, Berkeley: 1980.
 Eugene Richards, Photographer, Brooklyn, New York: 1980.
 Mary Robison, Writer; Briggs-Copeland Assistant Professor of English and American Literature and Languages, Harvard University: 1980.
 Susan Rothenberg, Artist, Santa Fe, New Mexico: 1980.
 Anya Peterson Royce, Professor of Anthropology, Comparative Literature, and Music, Indiana University at Bloomington: 1980.
 David Lee Rubin, Professor of French, University of Virginia: 1980.
 Kenneth Ruddle, Research Scholar, Hyogo-Ken, Japan: 1980.
 Thomas Sanchez, Writer, San Francisco, California: 1980.
 Antonio Sánchez-Romeralo, Professor of Spanish, University of California, Davis: 1980.
 T. Michael Sanders, Jr., Professor of Physics, University of Michigan: 1980.
 Harold Scheub, Evjue-Bascom Professor of African Languages and Literature, University of Wisconsin–Madison: 1980.
 Gary Schmidgall, Scholar, New York City: 1980.
 Howard Schuman, Emeritus Professor of Sociology and Research Scientist, Institute for Social Research, University of Michigan: 1980.
 Michael H. Schwartz, Professor of Sociology, State University of New York at Stony Brook: 1980.
 Marilyn Shatz, Professor of Psychology and Director, Program in Linguistics, University of Michigan: 1980.
 Sara J. Shettleworth, Professor of Psychology, University of Toronto: 1980.
 Donald Shields, Artist, Royal Oak, Michigan: 1980.
 Henry L. Shipman, Annie J. Cannon Professor of Physics and Astronomy, University of Delaware: 1980.
 James T. Siegel, Professor of Anthropology and Asian Studies, Cornell University: 1980.
 Marc Simmons, Historian, Cerrillos, New Mexico: 1980.
 Josef Skvorecky, Writer; Professor Emeritus of English, University of Toronto: 1980.
 Susan Snyder, Gil and Frank Multin Professor Emeritus of English, Swarthmore College: 1980.
 Elliott R. Sober, Hans Reichenbach Professor of Philosophy, University of Wisconsin–Madison: 1980.
 Werner Sollors, Henry B. and Anne M. Cabot Professor of English Literature, Harvard University: 1980.
 Zoltán G. Soos, Professor of Chemistry, Princeton University: 1980.
 Lewis Spratlan, Composer; Professor of Music, Amherst College: 1980.
 Jon Stallworthy, Reader in English Literature, University of Oxford: 1980.
 Steven M. Stanley, Chairman, Professor of Geological Sciences, Case Western Reserve University: 1980.
 Susan Staves, Paul Proswimmer Professor of the Humanities, Brandeis University: 1980.
 Michael L. Steer, Professor of Surgery, Harvard University Medical School: 1980.
 Stuart Page Stegner, Professor Emeritus of American Literature, University of California, Santa Cruz: 1980.
 Gerald Stern, Poet; Professor Emeritus of English, University of Iowa: 1980.
 Charles J. Stone, Professor of Statistics, University of California, Berkeley: 1980.
 Robert Franklin Storey, Professor of English, Temple University: 1980.
 Richard R. Strathmann, Professor of Zoology and Resident Associate Director, Friday Harbor Laboratories, University of Washington: 1980.
 Hiroshi Sugimoto, Photographer, New York City: 1980.
 Moss E. Sweedler, Cryptologic Mathematician, National Security Agency and Professor Emeritus of Mathematics, Cornell University: 1980.
 Dickran L. Tashjian, Professor of Comparative Culture and Social Science, University of California, Irvine: 1980.
 Gordon O. Taylor, Professor of English, University of Tulsa: 1980.
 Michael J. Todd, Leon C. Welch Professor of Mathematics, Cornell University: 1980.
 C. Richard Tracy, Professor of Zoology, Colorado State University: 1980.
 William G. Tucker, Artist; Willow, New York: 1980.
 Sherry Turkle, Professor of Sociology, Massachusetts Institute of Technology: 1980.
 James G. Turner, Professor of English, University of California at Berkeley: 1980.
 Emil R. Unanue, Chair, Mallinckrodt Professor of Pathology, Washington University of Medicine, St. Louis, MO: 1980.
 DeWain Valentine, Artist, Gardena, California: 1980.
Jan M. Vansina, John D. MacArthur and Vilas Professor Emeritus of History and Emeritus Professor of Anthropology, University of Wisconsin–Madison: 1980.
 Sidney Verba, Carl H. Pforzheimer University Professor and Director of the University Library, Harvard University: 1980.
 Martha J. Vicinus, Professor of English, Women's Studies & History, University of Michigan: 1980.
 Maris A. Vinovskis, A.M. and H.P. Bentley Professor of History and Research Scientist, Center for Political Studies, Institute for Social Research, University of Michigan: 1980.
 Victor E. Viola, Distinguished Professor of Chemistry, Indiana University: 1980.
 Jack L. Walker, Deceased. Political Science: 1980.
 Daniel J. Watermeier, Professor of Theatre and Drama, University of Toledo: 1980.
 Robert S. Weiss, Senior Fellow, Institute of Gerontology and Emeritus Professor of Sociology, University of Massachusetts Boston: 1980.
 Peter Westen, Professor of Law, University of Michigan Law School: 1980.
 Hayden White, Presidential Professor of Historical Studies, University of California, Santa Cruz: 1980.
 Alec Wilder, Deceased. Music Composition: 1980.
 Barbara Wilk, Artist and Film Maker, Westport, Connecticut: 1980.
 William H. Willis, Professor of Greek in Classical Studies, Duke University: 1980.
 John F. Wilson, Agate Brown and George L. Collord Professor of Religion, Princeton University: 1980.
 William H. Wing, Professor of Physics and Optical Sciences, University of Arizona: 1980.
 Frederick Wiseman, Film Maker, Cambridge, Massachusetts: 1980.
 Ira Wohl, Film Maker, Beverly Hills, California: 1980.
 Isser Woloch, Moore Collegiate Professor of History, Columbia University: 1980.
 Gordon S. Wood, Alva O. Way University Professor of History, Brown University: 1980.
 Gordon Wright, William H. Bonsall Professor Emeritus of History, Stanford University: 1980.
 Shing-Tung Yau, Professor of Mathematics, Harvard University: 1980.
 James A. Yorke, Distinguished University Professor; Director, Institute for Physical Science and Technology, University of Maryland at College Park: 1980.
 Wilbur Zelinsky, Professor Emeritus of Geography, Pennsylvania State University: 1980.
 Harriet Zuckerman, Professor Emerita of Sociology, Columbia University; Vice President, Andrew W. Mellon Foundation: 1980.
 R. Tom Zuidema, Professor of Anthropology, University of Illinois at Urbana-Champaign: 1980.
 Ellen Taaffe Zwilich, Composer, Riverdale, New York: 1980.

1980 Latin American and Caribbean Fellows 
 Jorge Alberto Tadeo Blaquier, Associate Director, Fertilab, Buenos Aires, Argentina: 1980.
 Jorge E. Dandler, Senior Specialist, Organización Internacional del Trabajo, Costa Rica: 1980.
 René Drucker-Colín, Head, Department of Neuroscience, Center for Research in Cellular Physiology, and Professor of Pharmacology, School of Medicine, National Autonomous University of Mexico, Mexico City: 1980.
 Waldemar Espinoza Soriano, Professor of Andean History, National University of San Marcos, Lima: 1980.
 Juan José Gagliardino, Career Scientist, National Research Council of Argentina; Associate Professor of Physiology and Biophysics, and Director, Center for Experimental and Applied Endocrinology, National University of La Plata School of Medicine: 1980.
 Néstor Fadrique González-Cadavid. Professor of Biochemistry, Central University of Venezuela, Caracas: 1980.
 Francisco Hervé, Professor of Geology, University of Chile, Santiago: 1980.
 Denzil H. Hurley, Artist; Professor of Art, University of Washington, Seattle: 1980.
 Carlos Alberto Lersundy, Film Maker, Bogotá: 1980.
 Earl Wilbert Lovelace, Writer, Matura, Trinidad: 1980.
 Isaura Meza, Head, Professor of Cell Biology, Center for Research and Advanced Studies, National Polytechnic Institute, Mexico City: 1980.
 Brian Nissen, Artist, New York City: 1980.
 Alejandro Oliveros, Writer, Valencia, Venezuela: 1980.
 Catalina Parra (Troncoso), Artist, New York City: 1980.
 Liliana Porter, Artist; Professor of Art, Queens College, CUNY: 1980.
 Abelardo Sánchez-León, Poet; Vice President, DESCO, Lima, Peru: 1980.
 Feliciano Sánchez Sinencio, Professor of Physics, School of Physics and Mathematics, and Associate Professor of Physics, Center for Research and Advanced Studies, National Polytechnic Institute, Mexico City: 1980.
 José M. B. Santilli, Photographer, São Paulo: 1980.
 Augusto Tamayo Vargas, Professor Emeritus of Literature, National University of San Marcos, Lima; Director, National Museum of History, Lima: 1980.
 Regina Vater, Artist, Austin, Texas: 1980.

References

External links 
 Guggenheim Memorial Foundation Home Page

1980
1980 awards